Rose Mukankomeje is a Rwandan politician, biologist, and environmental activist, whose work addresses conservation of Rwandan forests.

Career 
Mukankomeje served as a member of the Rwandan parliament from 1995 to 2001.

Mukankomeje served as Director General of the Rwandan Environment Management Authority (REMA). Her work led to a 2011 Future Policy Award for Rwanda’s National Forest Policy, which cited Rwanda's "major reversal in the trend of declining forest cover."

In 2013, Mukankomeje received a Forest Hero Award from the United Nations Forum on Forests. The award cited her development of Umuganda, a monthly community-based tree-planting project, her promotion of sustainable agriculture, and her work on a national plastic bag ban.

In March 2016, Mukankomeje was fired from her REMA role, amid allegations of impeding a corruption investigation. She was accused of destruction of evidence, breach of professional secrecy, and tarnishing the image of state institutions, arrested on March 20, and prosecuted, though the charges were dropped in September 2016.

In 2019, Mukankomeje was appointed Director General of High Education Council (HEC) in Rwanda.

Personal life 
Mukankomeje was studying abroad during the Rwandan genocide, in which her parents and siblings were killed. When she returned to Rwanda, she became a foster parent to 24 children who had lost their families.

Mukankomeje earned a PhD in biology in 1992.

Selected publications 

 Mukankomeje, R., F. Laviolette, and J-P. Descy. Régime alimentaire de Tilapia, Oreochromis niloticus, du lac Muhazi (Rwanda). Annales de Limnologie-International Journal of Limnology 30.4 (1994).
 Mukankomeje, R., Plisnier, PD., Descy, JP. et al. Lake Muzahi, Rwanda: limnological features and phytoplankton production. Hydrobiologia 257, 107–120 (1993). https://doi.org/10.1007/BF00005951
 Mukankomeje, R., Micha, J. C., Descy, J. P., & Frank, V. Potential production of an introduced species (Protopterus aethiopicus Heckel, 1871) based on ecosystem Lake Muhazi (Rwanda) modelling. Mededelingen der Zittingen-Koninklijke Academie voor Overzeese Wetenschappen (1996).

References

External links 

Living people
21st-century Rwandan women politicians
21st-century Rwandan politicians
Rwandan scientists

Rwandan women scientists
Rwandan environmentalists
Year of birth missing (living people)